Kerala Automobiles Limited (KAL) is a public sector automobile manufacturing company in Thiruvananthapuram, Kerala, India. The KAL undertakes the manufacturing and marketing of various models of Three Wheelers. The company is ISO 9001:2015 certified.

Overview
KAL products include Pick up Van, Delivery Vans, Hydraulic Tippers, etc., and exports three-wheeler vehicles to Egypt.

Kerala Automobiles Limited’s (KAL) plant at Aralumoodu, near Neyyattinkara, will commence the manufacture of electric buses for the Kerala State Road Transport Corporation (KSRTC), upcoming year.

Models
 Kerala Neem G
 Kerala Green Stream
 Electric Pick-up Van
 Electric Tipper Van

References

External links
 KAL Official site

Companies based in Thiruvananthapuram
Government-owned companies of Kerala
Motor vehicle manufacturers of India
Vehicle manufacturing companies established in 1978
1978 establishments in Kerala
Indian companies established in 1978